Hash Bash is an annual event held in Ann Arbor, Michigan, originally held every April 1, but now on the first Saturday of April at noon on the University of Michigan Diag. A collection of speeches, live music, and occasional civil disobedience are centered on the goal of reforming federal, state, and local marijuana laws. The first Hash Bash was held on Saturday, April 1, 1972, in response to the March 9th 1972 decision by Michigan Supreme Court declaring unconstitutional the law used to convict cultural activist John Sinclair for possession of two marijuana joints. This action left the State of Michigan without a law prohibiting the use of marijuana until after the weekend of April 1, 1972. Chef Ra was a fixture of the Hash Bash for 19 consecutive years before his death in late 2006.

Before cannabis legalization in Michigan, the penalty for cannabis law violations in the City of Ann Arbor was a $30 fine and $25 court costs for a total of $55, and was a civil infraction ticket. The campus falls under state, not city jurisdiction but "for decades, police had in the past exercised discretion and a general tolerance for public marijuana use at the annual Hash Bash. Marijuana is openly consumed annually on the campus and at past events, few, if any, arrests occur. There is a general understanding that during this time, peaceful protesters can engage in the civil disobedience of cannabis consumption and police generally will not enforce state law."

History 

The second annual Hash Bash, in 1973, attracted approximately 3,000 participants. That year, state representative Perry Bullard, a proponent of marijuana legalization, attended and smoked marijuana, an act which later earned him criticism from political opponents.

Hash Bash participants did not encounter significant police interference until the seventh annual event, in 1978, when local police booked, cited, photographed, and released those participants alleged to be using illegal substances. By 1985 the Hash Bash had a 0 attendance rate but quickly arose to become a major protest in Ann Arbor.

The 2009 Hash Bash on April 4 celebrated medical marijuana's victory in Michigan and was the largest gathering that the event had seen in years, with an estimated 1,600 participants – an increased turnout which the Michigan Daily attributed to the "wider acceptance of recreational drug use both on campus and across the country".

The 2010 Hash Bash on April 3 had an estimated 5,000 attendees.

The 2015 Hash Bash had a record 8,000–15,000 attendees largely owing to the appearance of comedian Tommy Chong and was 2 hours long instead of the usual hour.

In 2019, Michigan Governor Gretchen Whitmer recorded a video for Hash Bash attendees that celebrated the state's legalization of recreational cannabis.  Said Whitmer, "We worked hard, we got it done, we made recreational marijuana legal in the state of Michigan."  Whitmer also attended the event the previous year while she was running for governor.

Recent and upcoming Hash Bash dates

2021: 50th annual - April 3 (virtual event due to coronavirus)
2020: 49th annual - April 4 (canceled due to coronavirus)
2019: 48th annual - April 6
2018: 47th annual - April 7
2017: 46th annual - April 1
2016: 45th annual - April 2
2015: 44th annual - April 4
2014: 43rd annual - April 5
2013: 42nd annual - April 6
2012: 41st annual - April 7
2011: 40th annual - April 2
2010: 39th annual - April 3
2009: 38th annual - April 4 
2008: 37th annual - April 5
2007: 36th annual - April 7
2006: 35th annual - April 1
2005: 34th annual - April 2
2004: 33rd annual - April 3
2003: 32nd annual - April 5

References

External links
Annual Hash Bash - Ann Arbor, Michigan
Freedom Activist Network's Guide To Ann Arbor Hash Bash
Monroe Street Fair official site
"Pro-pot event gets touch of Hollywood"  - Geoff Larcom for the Ann Arbor News, April 8, 2007.

Cannabis events in the United States
Cannabis in Michigan
Culture of Ann Arbor, Michigan
Recurring events established in 1972
1972 establishments in Michigan
1972 in cannabis
Spring (season) events in the United States